"Am I Wrong" is a 2000 house song by Étienne de Crécy. The track is mainly instrumental except for sampling the phrase "am I wrong" from Millie Jackson's voice singing "Am I wrong to hunger...", from the song "(If Loving You Is Wrong) I Don't Want to Be Right". The song was lead single from his album Tempovision, and its 3D animated video received wide airplay in Europe. "Am I Wrong" charted on European dance and house charts, and peaked at #44 in the UK Singles Chart in January 2001. The song is best remembered for its prize-winning video clip.

Video

De Crécy commissioned his brother, Geoffroy, to make three animated videos using 3D computer graphics for the album singles "Am I Wrong", "Scratched" and "Tempovision". The "Am I Wrong" video was in large part critical commentary on the food industry and the then current scandal of mad cow disease. The video for "Am I Wrong" was entered in several European film festivals. The video went on to win the best video for 2000 at the 2001 Victoires de la musique.

Charts

References

2000 singles
2000 songs